The Office of Navajo and Hopi Indian Relocation (ONHIR) is an independent agency of the executive branch of the U.S. Government. It is responsible for assisting Hopi and Navajo Indians impacted by the relocation that Congress mandated in the Navajo-Hopi Land Settlement Act of 1974 for the members of the Hopi and Navajo tribes who were living on each other's land.

References 

Hopi
Navajo Nation
United States federal Indian policy
Independent agencies of the United States government